Jack Kerouac House is a national historic site located in Orlando, Florida. Built as a rectangular, one-story, front gable, Frame Vernacular house, it was the home of the American author and Beat Generation founder Jack Kerouac.

It was added to the National Register of Historic Places in 2013.

See also

 The Jack Kerouac Writers in Residence Project of Orlando, Inc.

References

National Register of Historic Places in Orange County, Florida
Buildings and structures in Orlando, Florida